Roger Yeoman (born 15 January 1957) is a British sailor. He competed in the Flying Dutchman event at the 1988 Summer Olympics.

References

External links
 

1957 births
Living people
British male sailors (sport)
Olympic sailors of Great Britain
Sailors at the 1988 Summer Olympics – Flying Dutchman
Sportspeople from Cardiff